Crown Vic  is a 2019 American crime thriller film written and directed by Joel Souza, with Alec Baldwin having served as one of the producers, and stars Thomas Jane, Luke Kleintank, Gregg Bello, David Krumholtz, Bridget Moynahan, Scottie Thompson, and Josh Hopkins. The film focuses on the events during a night shift for veteran LAPD officer Ray Mandel and his trainee Nick Holland. The film's title derives from the Ford Crown Victoria, a car widely used by US police, which the main characters also use. It premiered on April 26, 2019, in the Tribeca Film Festival, and was released to theatres and on-demand on November 8, 2019 in the United States. The film received mixed reviews from critics, who noted similarities with the 2001 film Training Day.

Plot
Nick Holland is a newly minted officer with the Los Angeles Police Department. In his first night shift, he is assigned to patrol the city with experienced policeman Ray Mandel. Ray and Nick are completely different personalities; while Nick is a down-to-earth, self-proclaimed world improver, Ray is a divorced pessimist with a penchant for breaking the rules and resorting to violence. In their shift, they are responsible for all kinds of incidents, from robberies to domestic unrest to car fires. They also rescue a suspect who is nearly killed by a reckless plainclothes officer. Ray has the drug-addicted widow of his former partner picked up so he can talk to her and try to help her, and he has her abusive boyfriend taken in by another officer. Later, he goes off-duty and goes outside his territory to rescue his former partner's daughter who was abandoned by her mother who could not handle her. Ray admits to being the girl's biological father. The cops also find the abandoned car which was driven by masked robbers who killed several people and were shown in the opening scene and several more times. In a traffic stop, Nick is taken hostage and almost killed.

Cast
 Thomas Jane as Ray Mandel
 Luke Kleintank as Nick Holland
 Gregg Bello as Don Koski
 David Krumholtz as Stroke Adams
 Bridget Moynahan as Tracy Peters
 Scottie Thompson as Claire
 Josh Hopkins as Jack VanZandt
 Devon Werkheiser as Floyd Stiles
 Emma Ishta as Ally

Production
Despite being set in Los Angeles, the movie was filmed in Buffalo, New York. Producer Alec Baldwin told The Hollywood Reporter that he had to miss the opportunity to star in the film.

Release
The film had its world premiere at the Tribeca Film Festival on April 26, 2019. It was released in select theaters on November 8, 2019, and on VOD by Screen Media Films on January 7, 2020.

Reception

Box office
Crown Vic grossed $3,868 in one opening theatre in North America against a production budget of $3.6 million.

Critical response
The website's critics consensus reads, "Led by a solid turn from the well-cast Thomas Jane, Crown Vic gets an impressive amount of mileage out of its familiar cop thriller framework." On Metacritic, the film has a weighted average score of 47 out of 100, based on 7 critics, indicating "mixed or average reviews".

Glenn Kenny of RogerEbert.com awarded the film 1.5 stars out of four, commenting, "Aside from a rock-solid performance by Thomas Jane as the grizzled cop, Crown Vic, which is named after the Ford model car that is the default of the LAPD black-and-white, has very little to offer the discriminating moviegoer." Movie Nation'''s Roger Moore gave the film two stars out of four, stating "Crown Vic is a grounded and gritty cops-on-the-night-shift melodrama built around a tightly coiled turn by Thomas Jane... Crown Vic isn’t a bad picture. It’s just too unexceptional to stand out." Rex Reed of Observer Media gave the film two stars out of four and said, "I never cease to wonder how some films manage to borrow, imitate, copy, or steal from older films without acknowledging or crediting the originals. A predictable, ho-hum police procedural called Crown Vic, about one night of violence and death with a veteran Los Angeles cop assigned to escort a rookie cop through the criminal underground while teaching him the ropes, is so close to the 2001 Training Day that it’s practically a remake."

Dennis Harvey of Variety noted, "That’s a lot of narrative content, and Crown Vic varies in involvement and credibility as it juggles the more melodramatic aspects with the quasi-vérité ones. Still, it all works more often than not, thanks to the able lead performances and Souza’s generally smooth handling." Frank Scheck of The Hollywood Reporter stated, "The filmmaker displays a genuine flair for staging exciting action sequences, and the ever-reliable Jane delivers a solid lead performance, here tempering his natural machismo with a sympathetic, mournful quality. But there's just too much about Crown Vic'' that we haven't seen a thousand times before, to more impactful effect."

References

External links
 
 
 

2019 films
American crime action films
American buddy cop films
Fictional portrayals of the Los Angeles Police Department
Films set in Los Angeles
American police detective films
Films about police misconduct
Fictional gangsters
Fictional murderers
2010s buddy cop films
Hood films
Films set in Koreatown, Los Angeles
Films shot in Buffalo, New York
2010s English-language films
2010s American films